Llano Estacado Winery is a winery located in Lubbock, Texas. It is one of the oldest wineries in Texas.

History
In 1976, Llano Estacado Winery was established in southeast Lubbock County, Texas, while it was still a dry county. The state legislature passed a bill two years later permitting wine production in dry counties. The winery planted its first vineyard in 1978.

References

External links
Official site: http://www.llanowine.com/

Companies based in Lubbock, Texas
Wineries in Texas
1976 establishments in Texas
American companies  established in 1976